The Greater Manchester Women's Football League is a women's association football league in Greater Manchester, England run by a league committee. Matches are played on Sunday afternoons.

The league is at levels 7 and 8 of the women's pyramid. The league promotes to the North West Women's Regional Football League and does not relegate to any league.

The league also runs Challenge Cup and League Cup competitions.

Leagues

2021–22 Leagues

2019–20 Member Clubs

League champions

Challenge Cup

League Cup
The GMWFL also runs an Open Age League Cup competition.

References

External links
Official website

7
Football in Greater Manchester